Kolindros is a town and a former municipality in Pieria regional unit, in Central Macedonia, Greece. Since the 2011 local government reform it has been part of the municipality Pydna-Kolindros, of which it is a municipal unit. The municipal unit has an area of 124.639 km2, the community 47.856 km2. In 2011, the municipal unit had a population of 3,883 residents. The community of Kolindros, consisting of the settlement of Kolindros and that of Paliampela, has a population of 3,032 residents.

Notable people
George Zorbas

International relations

Kolindros is a member of the Charter of European Rural Communities, a town twinning association across the European Union, alongside with:

 Bienvenida, Spain
 Bièvre, Belgium
 Bucine, Italy
 Cashel, Ireland
 Cissé, France
 Desborough, England, United Kingdom
 Esch (Haaren), Netherlands
 Hepstedt, Germany
 Ibănești, Romania
 Kandava, Latvia
 Kannus, Finland
 Lassee, Austria
 Medzev, Slovakia
 Moravče, Slovenia
 Næstved, Denmark
 Nagycenk, Hungary
 Nadur, Malta
 Ockelbo, Sweden
 Pano Lefkara, Cyprus
 Põlva, Estonia
 Samuel (Soure), Portugal
 Slivo Pole, Bulgaria
 Starý Poddvorov, Czech Republic
 Strzyżów, Poland
 Tisno, Croatia
 Troisvierges, Luxembourg
 Žagarė (Joniškis), Lithuania

See also
Costas Kilias

External links
Kolindros
Kολινδρόs

References

Populated places in Pieria (regional unit)